Nikolai Gogol (1809–1852) was a Russian-Ukrainian writer.

Gogol may also refer to:

People

Surname
 Jonah Gogol (died 1602), bishop of Pinsk-Turowski
 Mariusz Gogol (born 1991), Polish footballer
 Michał Mieszko Gogol (born 1985), Polish volleyball player and coach
 Nikolay Gogol (canoeist) (1948–1997), Soviet sprint canoer
 Oleg Gogol (born 1968), Belarusian wrestler
 Shmuel Gogol (1924–1993), Holocaust survivor and musician

Given name
 Gogol Premier (born 1957), French punk singer

Places
 Gogol, Goa, a suburb of Margão, Goa, India
 Gogol, Poland, a village
 Gogol River, in Papua New Guinea
 Gogol Center, avant-garde theater

Fiction
 Gogol (Samaresh Basu), a child detective
 General Gogol, a character in the James Bond series
 Gogol, an organization in Nikita
 Erzulie Gogol, a Discworld character
 Griffin Gogol, a Marvel comics character
Gogol Ganguli, a character in the film The Namesake, as well as the novel it was based upon

Science
 2361 Gogol, an asteroid
 Gogol (crater), on Mercury

Other uses
 Gogol (film series), a series of fantasy-horror films

See also
 Google (disambiguation)
 Googol, a number
 Gogol mogol or Kogel mogel, a dessert